Lex Gibb was a former Australian professional soccer player who played as a half-back for Australian clubs and the Australia national soccer team and was son of Alex Gibb.

Early life
Gibb was born in Ipswich, to Australia's first capped player Alex.

Club career
Gibb played with the Bundamba Rangers and Latrobe. On 12 March 1948, it was rumoured that Lex Gibb would sign for Brisbane club Corinthians. A day later, he officially transferred to Corinthians where he received a £50 payment signing.

International career
Gibb played for the Australia national soccer team, and played 8 times in three match tours against India, South Africa and New Zealand.

Personal life

Family and relationships
Lex was born to father Alex Mother Margaret (nee Allan). He had brothers Alan and Alfie and sisters Margaret and Mary.

Lex Gibb was married on 9 August 1941 to wife Myrtle Herton in Bundamba.

Career statistics

International

References

Living people
Australian soccer players
Association football midfielders
Australia international soccer players
Year of birth missing (living people)